Barack Obama (born 1961) was the president of the United States from 2009 to 2017.

Obama may also refer to:

People
 Obama (surname), a surname of African or Japanese origin, and any of several people with that name
 Obama (drag queen), Italian drag queen

Places
 Obama, Fukui, a city in Japan
 Obama Castle (Wakasa Province), Japan
 Obama Domain, a feudal domain in Edo-period Japan
 Obama, Nagasaki, a former town in Japan
 Obama Onsen, a hot spring in Nagasaki, Japan
 Obama Castle (Mutsu Province), Japan
 Mount Obama (Boggy Peak), the highest point in Antigua and Barbuda

Transportation
 Obama Line, a railroad line operated by West Japan Railway Company
 Higashi-Obama Station, a train station on the Obama Line
 Obama Station, a train station on the Obama Line
 Obama Nishi Interchange, a road junction in Fukui Prefecture, Japan

Other uses
 Obama (genus), a genus of terrestrial flatworms
 Obama Day, a national holiday in Kenya
 Etheostoma obama, a species of darter endemic to the eastern United States
 Tosanoides obama, a coral reef fish species in Hawaii
"Obama", a song by Michael Shannon
"Obama", a song by Anohni from the 2016 album Hopelessness
"Obama", a song by Blueface from the 2020 album Find the Beat
Welcome Obama, an Indian Telugu-language film directed by Singeetham Srinivasa Rao

See also
 List of things named after Barack Obama
 Kohama (disambiguation)
 Obamacare, the Patient Protection and Affordable Care Act
 Ohama (disambiguation)
 Oppama (disambiguation)